Rozsoshentsi is a village in the Poltava Raion, Poltava Oblast, Ukraine. It belongs to Shcherbani rural hromada, one of the hromads of Ukraine.

Demographics
According to the 1989 census, the population of Rozsoshentsi was 6,115, of which 2,961 were men and 3,154 were women. According to the 2001 census, 6,639 people lived in the village.

Languages
Native language as of the Ukrainian Census of 2001:

References

Villages in Poltava Raion